Sports-Concert Hall Almaz is an indoor sporting arena located in Cherepovets, Russia.  The capacity of the arena is 3,500.  It is the former home arena of the Severstal Cherepovets ice hockey team, which has since moved to the Ice Palace.

Indoor ice hockey venues in Russia
Indoor arenas in Russia
Severstal Cherepovets
Buildings and structures in Vologda Oblast